The Chung Young Yang Embroidery Museum, founded by Dr. Young Yang Chung in Seoul, is an exhibition, educational, and research facility dedicated to advancing the knowledge and appreciation of embroidery and textile arts. 

Inaugurated in May 2004 by Sookmyung Women's University.
It was closed for renovation in December 2017. It is expected to reopen in September 2019.

Its exhibits are not limited to Korean embroidery; there are also items from other areas in East Asia (notably Chinese embroidery on imperial robes) and elsewhere.

See also
 Han Sang Soo Embroidery Museum, also in Seoul

References

External links
  
 Former official page 
 Google Arts & Culture: 3 online exhibitions

 

Art museums and galleries in Seoul
Decorative arts museums
Museums established in 2004
Textile museums
2004 establishments in South Korea
Embroidery